Lucas Yan Cabral Azeredo Chianca (born 25 August 1995) better known as Lucas Chumbo, is a Brazilian professional surfer.

Career 
In February 2018 he won the Nazare Challenge in the Men's Big Wave category with the better score of the championship's history. In the same year, he received the 2018 Biliabong XXL in the category of best male performance.

In January 2020 he participated in the reality show Big Brother Brasil 20, as a celebrity, being the first evicted of the program (20th place) with 75,54% of votes against Bianca Andrade (24,46%).

In February 2020 he and Kai Lenny won the Nazaré Tow Surfing Challenge as partners in the Men's Big Wave category, at Praia do Norte (Nazaré), in Portugal.

Filmography

Awards and nominations

References 

1995 births
Living people
Brazilian surfers
Big Brother Brasil
Big Brother (franchise) contestants
People from Saquarema